The Association for the Education and Guardianship of International Students (AEGIS) is concerned with the welfare and well-being of international students at boarding schools in the United Kingdom, especially as the leading organization with respect to associated organizational accreditation within the UK.

AEGIS was founded in 1994. It is a registered charity with the Charity Commission for England and Wales. Its activities include inspection and accreditation of guardianship organisations. Organizations can receive AEGIS certification. AEGIS also organizes conferences for schools and guardianship organisations and schools covering care and protection of international students. The charity is recognised by the Home Office of the UK Government. AEGIS partners with other relevant organizations. It helps to maintain and improve guardianship standards. It also aids with contracts between parents and guardians.

AEGIS is based in Stroud, Gloucestershire, England. It was granted charitable status in 2005. It has helped ensure that overseas students have an appropriate temporary guardian during the COVID-19 pandemic.

References

External links

1994 establishments in England
Organizations established in 1994
Associations of schools
Professional associations based in the United Kingdom
Accreditation organizations
School accreditors
Charities based in Gloucestershire
Stroud